This is a list of all the wildflowers native to Minnesota by common name, following Minnesota DNR conventions. Where several species of plants share part of a common name, they have been grouped together under that name; this is for indexing purposes and does not always indicate a taxonomic relationship.

A
 Alexanders
 Golden alexanders (Zizia aurea)
 Heart-leaved alexanders (Zizia aptera)
 Anemone
 Canada anemone (Anemone canadensis)
 Cut-leaved anemone (Anemone multifida var. multifida)
 Wood anemone (Anemone quinquefolia)
 Aplectrum
 Adam and Eve (Aplectrum hyemale)
 Asters
 Aromatic aster (Symphyotrichum oblongifolium)
 Awl aster (Symphyotrichum pilosum)
 Bog aster (Symphyotrichum boreale)
 Crooked aster (Symphyotrichum prenanthoides)
 Drummond's aster (Symphyotrichum drummondii)
 Eastern panicled aster (Symphyotrichum lanceolatum ssp. lanceolatum)
 Flat-topped aster (Doellingeria umbellata)
 Heath aster (Symphyotrichum ericoides)
 Heart-leaved aster (Symphyotrichum cordifolium)
 Large-leaved aster (Eurybia macrophylla)
 Lindley's aster (Symphyotrichum ciliolatum)
 Long aster (Symphyotrichum x longulum)
 Modest aster (Canadanthus modestus)
 New England aster (Symphyotrichum novae-angliae)
 New England aster and Heath aster hybrid (Symphyotrichum x amethystinum)
 Ontario aster (Symphyotrichum ontarionis)
 Red-stemmed aster (Symphyotrichum puniceum)
 Short's aster (Symphyotrichum shortii; threatened)
 Sickle-shaped aster (Symphyotrichum falcatum)
 Side-flowering aster (Symphyotrichum lateriflorum)
 Silky aster (Symphyotrichum sericeum)
 Skyblue aster (Symphyotrichum oolentangiense)
 Smooth aster (Symphyotrichum laeve)
 Veiny lined aster (Symphyotrichum praealtum)
 Western panicled aster (Symphyotrichum lanceolatum ssp. hesperium)
 Autumn sneezeweed (Helenium autumnale)

B
 Baneberries
 Red baneberry (Actaea rubra)
 White baneberry (Actaea pachypoda)
 Beard-tongues
 Large-flowered beard tongue (Penstemon grandiflorus)
 Pale beard tongue (Penstemon pallidus)
 Slender beard tongue (Penstemon gracilis)
 White beard tongue (Penstemon albidus)
 Bellworts
 Large-flowered bellwort (Uvularia grandiflora)
 Pale bellwort (Uvularia sessilifolia)
 Black-eyed Susan (Rudbeckia hirta)
 Blanketflower (Gaillardia aristata)
 Blazing stars
 Cylindric blazing star (Liatris cylindracea)
 Dotted blazing star (Liatris punctata)
 Great blazing star (Liatris pycnostachya)
 Northern plains blazing star (Liatris ligulistylis)
 Rough blazing star (Liatris aspera)
 Bloodroot (Sanguinaria canadensis)
 Bluebead lily (Clintonia borealis)
 Blueberries
 Lowbush blueberry (Vaccinium angustifolium)
 Velvet-leaved blueberry (Vaccinium myrtilloides)
 Blue-eyed grasses
 Field blue-eyed grass (Sisyrinchium campestre)
 Mountain blue-eyed grass (Sisyrinchium montanum montanum)
 Narrowleaf blue-eyed grass (Sisyrinchium angustifolium)
 Pointed-petal blue-eyed grass (Sisyrinchium mucronatum)
Blue flags
 Northern blue flag (Iris versicolor)
 Southern blue flag (Iris virginica var. shrevei)
 Bunchberry (Cornus canadensis)
 Butterflyweed (Asclepias tuberosa var. interior)

C
 Canada mayflower (Maianthemum canadense)
 Cinquefoils
 Bushy cinquefoil (Potentilla paradoxa)
 Marsh cinquefoil (Potentilla palustris)
 Pennsylvania cinquefoil (Potentilla pensylvanica)
 Rough cinquefoil (Potentilla norvegica)
 Shrubby cinquefoil (Potentilla fruticosa)
 Slender cinquefoil (Potentilla flabelliformis)
 Spreading cinquefoil (Potentilla effusa)
 Tall cinquefoil (Potentilla arguta)
 Wild Columbine (Aquilegia canadensis)
Coneflowers
 Gray-headed coneflower (Ratibida pinnata)
 Narrow-leaved purple coneflower (Echinacea pallida var. angustifolia)
 Prairie coneflower (Ratibida columnifera)
 Sweet coneflower (Rudbeckia subtomentosa)
 Tall coneflower (Rudbeckia laciniata var. laciniata)
 Three-leaved coneflower (Rudbeckia triloba var. triloba; special concern)
 Coralroot
 Autumn coralroot (Corallorhiza odontorhiza var. odontorhiza)
 Early coralroot (Corallorhiza trifida)
 Spotted coralroot (Corallorhiza maculata)
 Striped coralroot (Corallorhiza striata var. striata)
 Cottongrasses
 Chamisso's cottongrass (Eriophorum chamissonis)
 Delicate cottongrass (Eriophorum tenellum)
 Green-keeled cottongrass (Eriophorum viridicarinatum)
 Slender cottongrass (Eriophorum gracile)
 Tall cottongrass (Eriophorum polystachion)
 Tawny cottongrass (Eriophorum virginicum)
 Tussock cottongrass (Eriophorum vaginatum var. spissum)
 Cow parsnip (Heracleum maximum)
 Culver's root (Veronicastrum virginicum)

D
 Dogbanes
 Clasping dogbane (Apocynum sibiricum)
 Hemp dogbane or American hemp, (Apocynum cannabinum)
 Intermediate dogbane (Apocynum x floribundum)
 Spreading dogbane (Apocynum androsaemifolium)

E
 Evening primroses
 Common evening primrose (Oenothera biennis)
 Cleland's evening primrose (Oenothera clelandii)
 Cut-leaved evening primrose (Oenothera laciniata)
 Northern evening primrose (Oenothera parviflora)
 Nuttall's evening primrose (Oenothera nuttallii)
 Perennial evening primrose (Oenothera perennis)
 Rhombic evening primrose (Oenothera rhombipetala)
 Toothed evening primrose (Calylophus serrulatus)

F
 False Solomon's Seals
 Common false Solomon's seal (Smilacina racemosa)
 Starry false Solomon's seal (Smilacina stellata)
 Three-leaved false Solomon's seal (Smilacina trifolia)
 Fireweed (Epilobium angustifolium)
 Flodman's thistle (Cirsium flodmanii)

G
 Gaywings (Polygala paucifolia)
 Gentians
 Billington's gentian (Gentiana x billingtonii)
 Bottle gentian (Gentiana andrewsii)
 Downy gentian (Gentiana puberulenta)
 Great Lakes gentian (Gentiana rubricaulis)
 Greater fringed gentian (Gentianopsis crinita)
 Horse gentian (Triosteum aurantiacum)
 Lesser fringed gentian (Gentianopsis procera)
 Northern gentian (Gentiana affinis; special concern)
 Spurred gentian (Halenia deflexa)
 Stiff gentian (Gentianella quinquefolia var. occidentalis)
 Yellowish gentian (Gentiana flavida)
 Giant hyssops
 Blue giant hyssop (Agastache foeniculum)
 Purple giant hyssop (Agastache scrophulariaefolia)
 Yellow giant hyssop (Agastache nepetoides)
 Goldenrod
 Canada goldenrod (Solidago canadensis)
 Early goldenrod (Solidago juncea)
 Giant goldenrod (Solidago gigantea)
 Gray goldenrod (Solidago nemoralis)
 Hairy goldenrod (Solidago hispida)
 Missouri goldenrod (Solidago missouriensis)
 Riddell's goldenrod (Solidago riddellii)
 Stiff goldenrod (Solidago rigida)
 Soft goldenrod (Solidago mollis; special concern)
 Upland white aster (Solidago ptarmicoides)
 Zigzag goldenrod (Solidago flexicaulis)
 Ground plum (Astragalus crassicarpus)
 Gumweed (Grindelia squarrosa)

H
 Harebell (Campanula rotundifolia)
 Hepaticas
 Sharp-lobed hepatica (Anemone acutiloba)
 Round-lobed hepatica (Anemone americana)
 Honeysuckles
 Bush honeysuckle (Diervilla lonicera)
 Fly honeysuckle (Lonicera canadensis)
 Grape honeysuckle (Lonicera reticulata)
 Hairy honeysuckle (Lonicera hirsuta)
 Mountain fly honeysuckle (Lonicera villosa)
 Swamp fly honeysuckle (Lonicera oblongifolia)
 Wild honeysuckle (Lonicera dioica)

I
 Indian paintbrushes
 Downy paintbrush (Castilleja sessiliflora)
 Indian paintbrush (Castilleja coccinea)
 Northern paintbrush (Castilleja septentrionalis; endangered)
 Indian pipe (Monotropa uniflora)

J
 Jack-in-the-pulpit (Arisaema triphyllum)
 Joe pye weeds
 Spotted Joe pye weed (Eupatorium maculatum)
 Sweet Joe pye weed (Eupatorium purpureum)

L
 Lady's slippers
 Andrew's lady's slipper (Cypripedium × andrewsii)
 Showy lady's slipper (Cypripedium reginae; the Minnesota State flower)
 Small white lady's slipper (Cypripedium candidum; special concern)
 Stemless lady's slipper, also known as Moccasin flower, (Cypripedium acaule)
 Yellow lady's slipper (Cypripedium calceolus)
 Leadplant (Amorpha canescens)

M
 Marsh marigolds
 Floating marsh marigold (Caltha natans; endangered)
 Common marsh marigold (Caltha palustris)
 Milk vetches
 Alpine milk vetch (Astragalus alpinus; endangered)
 Canada milk vetch (Astragalus canadensis)
 Cooper's milk vetch (Astragalus neglectus)
 Field milk vetch (Astragalus agrestis)
 Loose-flowered milkvetch (Astragalus tenellus)
 Lotus milk vetch (Astragalus lotiflorus)
 Missouri milk vetch (Astragalus missouriensis; special concern)
 Prairie milk vetch (Astragalus adsurgens)
 Racemose milk vetch (Astragalus racemosus; possibly non-native)
 Slender milk vetch (Astragalus flexuosus; special concern)
 Milkweeds
 Clasping milkweed (Asclepias amplexicaulis; special concern)
 Common milkweed (Asclepias syriaca)
 Green milkweed (Asclepias viridiflora)
 Narrow-leaved milkweed (Asclepias stenophylla; endangered)
 Oval-leaved milkweed (Asclepias ovalifolia)
 Poke milkweed (Asclepias exaltata)
 Prairie milkweed (Asclepias hirtella; threatened)
 Purple milkweed (Asclepias purpurascens)
 Showy milkweed (Asclepias speciosa)
 Sullivant's milkweed (Asclepias sullivantii; threatened)
 Swamp milkweed (Asclepias incarnata var. incarnata)
 Whorled milkweed (Asclepias verticillata)
 Woolly milkweed (Asclepias lanuginosa)
 Miterworts
 Naked miterwort (Mitella nuda)
 Two-leaved miterwort (Mitella diphylla)

O
 Orchids
 Hooker's orchid (Platanthera hookeri)
 Intermediate bog orchid (Platanthera × media)
 Large round-leaved orchid (Platanthera orbiculata)
 Long-bracted orchid (Ceologlossum viride var. varescens)
 Ragged fringed orchid (Platanthera lacera)
 Ram's head orchid (Cypripedium arietinum; threatened)
 Small green wood orchid (Platanthera clavellata; special concern)
 Small northern bog orchid (Platanthera obtusata)
 Small purple fringed orchid (Platanthera psycodes)
 Tall northern bog orchid (Platanthera hyperborea)
 Tall white bog orchid (Platanthera dilatata)
 Tubercled rein orchid (Platanthera flava var. herbiola; endangered)
 Western prairie fringed orchid (Platanthera praeclara; threatened)
 Ox-eye or early sunflower (Heliopsis helianthoides var. scabra)

P
 Prairie clover
 Foxtail prairie clover (Dalea leporina)
 Purple prairie clover (Dalea purpurea)
 Silky prairie clover (Dalea villosa)
 White prairie clover (Dalea candida)

R
 Roses
 Prairie rose (Rosa arkansana)
 Prickly rose (Rosa acicularis)
 Smooth wild rose (Rosa blanda)
 Wood's rose (Rosa woodsii var. woodsii)

S
 Silverleaf scurfpea (Pediomelum argophyllum)
 Spiderworts
 Bracted spiderwort (Tradescantia bracteata)
 Ohio spiderwort (Tradescantia ohiensis)
 Western spiderwort (Tradescantia occidentalis)
 Starflower (Trientalis borealis)
 Strawberries
 Common strawberry (Fragaria virginiana)
 Wood strawberry (Fragaria vesca var. americana)
 Sunflowers
 Bright sunflower (Helianthus × laetiflorus)
 Common sunflower (Helianthus annuus)
 Giant sunflower (Helianthus giganteus)
 Hairy sunflower (Helianthus hirsutus)
 Maximilian's sunflower (Helianthus maximiliani)
 Nuttall's sunflower (Helianthus nuttallii ssp. rydbergii; special concern)
 Prairie sunflower (Helianthus petiolaris var. petiolaris)
 Sawtooth sunflower (Helianthus grosseserratus)
 Stiff sunflower (Helianthus pauciflorus)
 Tickseed sunflower (Bidens aristosa)
 Western sunflower (Helianthus occidentalis var. occidentalis)
 Woodland sunflower (Helianthus strumosus)
 For early sunflower, see ox-eye.

T
 Tarragon (Artemisia dracunculus)
 Touch-me-nots
 Pale touch-me-not (Impatiens pallida)
 Spotted touch-me-not (Impatiens capensis)
 Trilliums
 Drooping trillium (Trillium flexipes)
 Large-flowered trillium (Trillium grandiflorum)
 Nodding trillium (Trillium cernuum var. macranthum)
 Snow trillium (Trillium nivale)
 Twinflower (Linnaea borealis var. longiflora)
 Twistedstalks
 Clasping leaved twistedstalk (Streptopus amplexifolius)
 Rose twistedstalk (Streptopus roseus var. longipes)

 Twinflower (Linnaea borealis var. longiflora)
 Twistedstalks
 Clasping leaved twistedstalk (Streptopus amplexifolius)
 Rose twistedstalk (Streptopus roseus var. longipes)

V
 Violets
 Arrow-leaved violet (Viola sagittata)
 Bearded birdfoot violet (Viola palmata var. pedatifida)
 Beardless birdfoot violet (Viola pedata)
 Big-leaved white violet (Viola blanda)
 Common blue violet (Viola sororia)
 Dog violet (Viola conspersa)
 Great-spurred violet (Viola selkirkii)
 Kidney-leaved violet (Viola renifolia)
 Marsh violet (Viola cucullata)
 Lance-leaved violet (Viola lanceolata; threatened)
 New England violet (Viola novae-angliae)
 Northern bog violet (Viola nephrophylla)
 Northern white violet (Viola macloskeyi var. pallens)
 Rugulose violet (Viola canadensis var. rugulosa)
 Sand violet (Viola adunca)
 Yellow prairie violet (Viola nuttallii; threatened)
 Yellow violet (Viola pubescens)
 Violet wood sorrel (Oxalis violacea)
 Virginia mountain mint (Pycnanthemum virginianum)

W
 White camas (Zigadenus elegans)
 Wild bergamot or bee-balm (Monarda fistulosa)
 Wild calla (Calla palustris)
 Wild licorice (Glycyrrhiza lepidota)
 Wild onions
 Nodding wild onion (Allium cernuum)
 Prairie wild onion (Allium stellatum)
 White wild onion (Allium textile)
 Wild sweet William (Phlox maculata)
 Wintergreen (Gaultheria procumbens)
 Wolfberry (Symphoricarpos occidentalis)
 Wood betony (Pedicularis canadensis)
 Wood lily (Lilium philadelphicum var. andinum)
 Wormwoods
 Sage wormwood (Artemisia frigida)
 Tall wormwood (Artemisia campestris)

References
Minnesota Department of Natural Resources (DNR): List of Vascular Plants of Minnesota — including native/nonnative status. (9/25/02 edition).

External links
 Wildflowers of Minnesota homepage — with 'Wildflowers Selector by Color' searches, Minnesota Natural Resources Dept.
  On-line Field Guide to Minnesota Wildflowers homepage

Wild flowers
Minnesota